The New People's Party (lit. New People's Political Party) was a South Korean left-wing political party that formed on 3 September 2017. The original name was "Dream of People" as a civic group, but it was changed to its current name by July 2017. The party was planning to combine with the People's United Party, also a left-wing party. Both parties were created by former members of the Unified Progressive Party, which dissolved in 2014. The party gained 2 seats out of 300 in the National Assembly in 2016, both of them from Ulsan.

On 15 October 2017, the combination was done and rebuilt as Minjung Party.

References

External links
 

2017 disestablishments in South Korea
2017 establishments in South Korea
Defunct political parties in South Korea
Korean nationalist parties
Left-wing nationalism in South Korea
Left-wing nationalist parties
Political parties disestablished in 2017
Political parties established in 2017
Progressive parties in South Korea